The Egyptian Olympic Committee (abbreviated as EOC) is a non-profit organization serving as the National Olympic Committee of Egypt and a part of the International Olympic Committee.

History
The Egyptian Olympic Committee was founded during the Khedivate of Egypt on June 13, 1910 in Alexandria by Angelo Bolanaki, first Egyptian athlete who participated in international sport competitions outside country. Egypt's first ever Olympic participation came in the 1912 Stockholm Olympic Games with one athlete in fencing, Ahmed Hassanein. Egypt was the 14th country to join the IOC.

List of presidents
The following is a list of presidents of the Egyptian Olympic Committee since its creation in 1910.

IOC Members

Executive committee
 President: Hesham Mohamed Tawfeq Hatab
 Vice President: Alaa Mashref
 Secretary General: Aladin Gabr
 IOC Member: Mounir Sabet
 Members:  Mohamed Abdel Aziz Ghonim, Sharif Al Arian

Member federations
The Egyptian National Federations are the organizations that coordinate all aspects of their individual sports. They are responsible for training, competition and development of their sports. There are currently 29 Olympic Summer Sport Federations in Egypt.

Controversy
At the 2016 Summer Olympics, Egyptian judoka Islam El Shahaby refused to shake the hand of Israeli judoka Or Sasson, who had defeated El Shahaby. In August 2016, the Disciplinary Committee of the International Olympic Committee issued a "severe reprimand" to El Shehaby for behavior violating "the rules of fair play and against the spirit of friendship embodied in the Olympic Values", and requested that the Egyptian Olympic Committee in the future make certain that all Egyptian athletes are properly educated as to the Olympic Values before they participate in the Olympic Games.

See also

References

External links
Official website

National Olympic Committees
 
Ol
1910 establishments in Egypt